Une Présence is a 1989 audio album recorded by French singer François Feldman. It provided two number one, two number two and one number seven singles in France. It remains to date the singer's most successful album, achieving Diamond status. The album also helped launch the career of American vocalist Joniece Jamison, who participated in two songs recorded as duets. In France, the album was charted for 86 weeks from 22 October 1989. It peaked at number two for one month and stayed in the top ten for 46 weeks.

Track listings
All tracks written and composed by François Feldman, M. Moreau and J. Moreau
 "J'ai peur"1 – 5:43
 "Les Valses de Vienne" – 4:06
 "Oser Oser" – 4:10
 "Une Présence" – 3:45
 "Bébé faut qu'on s'casse" – 4:20
 "Fragile Queen" – 6:05
 "Petit Frank" – 3:56
 "C'est toi qui m'as fait" – 5:28
 "Pour faire tourner le monde" – 3:56
 "Longue Nuit" – 4:37
 "Joue pas"1 – 6:46

1 Duet with Joniece Jamison

Personnel
 Kako Besset – trumpet
 Dominique Blanc-Francard – mixing
 Patrick Bourgoin – saxophone
 Debbie Davis – choir, chorus
 Jean-Claude Dubois – strings
 Thierry Durbet – arranger, programming, clavier
 François Feldman – choir, chorus, piano, arranger
 Jean Fredenucci – Producer
 Joniece Jamison – choir, chorus
 Didier Makaga – choir, chorus
 Antonietti Pascault – design
 Olivier Richter – assistant engineer
 Kamil Rustam – guitar

Charts and sales

References

1989 albums
François Feldman albums
French-language albums